The Richard Harris International Film Festival (RHIFF) is an annual film festival held in Limerick, Ireland, named for the actor Richard Harris (1930–2002), a native of the city. The festival is affiliated with the Irish Film and Television Academy and takes place in late October every year.

History

2013
The Richard Harris International Film Festival was established in 2013 by Rob Gill, Sylvia Moore Eleanor McSherry and Zeb Moore. For the first festival, the Irish film Life's a Breeze was shown, along with Harris' This Sporting Life, and several shorts. Harris memorabilia was displayed at Christ Church, United Presbyterian and Methodist.

2014
The second festival was held at 69 O'Connell Street; films shown included What Richard Did and Starred Up. The first Richard Harris Outstanding Talent Award was given to Jack Reynor.

2015
Composer Patrick Cassidy received the Outstanding Talent Award.

2016
For the first time, the festival was partnered with the Harris estate. Fionnula Flanagan received the Outstanding Talent Award.

2017
In 2017, RHIFF partnered with Shift72 to produce RHIFFTV, an online streaming platform. Dominic West received the Outstanding Talent Award. Ukrainian animated fantasy The Stolen Princess won the overall Best Film prize.

2018
In 2018, Patrick Bergin received the Outstanding Talent Award. Detainment, later nominated for the Academy Award for Best Live Action Short Film, won best film overall.

2019
120 films from 30 countries were shown over seven days. Moe Dunford received the Outstanding Talent Award. The festival included the iMET (Interactive Media Entertainment and Technology) summit virtual reality experience. The Millennium Theatre in Limerick Institute of Technology was used for screenings. Bellingcat: Truth in a Post-Truth World won Best Film.

2020
Due to the COVID-19 pandemic, no physical festival could take place. Jim Sheridan received the Outstanding Talent Award.

2021
Again there was no physical festival, due to COVID. Colin Farrell received the Richard Harris Outstanding Talent Award.

2022
The film will return to being in-person after a two-year hiatus.

See also

 List of film festivals

References

External links

IMDb page

Annual events in Ireland
Culture in Limerick (city)
Film festivals in Ireland
October events
Tourist attractions in County Limerick
2013 establishments in Ireland